The Victoria Tyees were a minor league baseball team based in Victoria, British Columbia. They originally played in the Class B level Northwest International League in 1919. From 1952 to 1954, a team of the same name played in the Class A level Western International League. In 1954, they were affiliated with the Portland Beavers. They played their home games at Royal Athletic Park.

Notable players
Jim Clark, Dain Clay, Cecil Garriott, Jay Heard, Eddie Lake, Steve Mesner and Neill Sheridan played for the team.

References

Baseball teams established in 1919
Defunct minor league baseball teams
Defunct baseball teams in Canada
Baseball teams in British Columbia